Éva Fórián (born 3 April 1960 in Debrecen) is a Hungarian sport shooter. She competed in rifle shooting events at the Summer Olympics in 1980, 1988, 1992, and 1996.

Olympic results

References

External links 
 
 
 
 

1960 births
Living people
ISSF rifle shooters
Hungarian female sport shooters
Shooters at the 1980 Summer Olympics
Shooters at the 1988 Summer Olympics
Shooters at the 1992 Summer Olympics
Shooters at the 1996 Summer Olympics
Olympic shooters of Hungary
Sportspeople from Debrecen